Stamina therapy (also known as Stamina method or simply Stamina) was a controversial and unproven treatment marketed in Italy by convicted quack Davide Vannoni during 2007–2014. Mainly aimed at neurodegenerative diseases, the method relied on the conversion of mesenchymal stem cells into neurons. Its details were kept secret by its promoters and Vannoni has never published any details in a scientific journal. In the absence of scientific validation, claims of its therapeutic effectiveness are unproven.

Faced with pro-Stamina street demonstrations and intense pressure from the media, the Italian government decided in May 2013 to allow the Stamina therapy to be provided in public hospitals despite the protests of the Italian and international scientific community. The experimental treatment was discontinued in October 2014.

Davide Vannoni 
Davide Vannoni (7 June 1967 in Turin – 10 December 2019 in Turin) was an associate professor at the University of Udine for the communication program of the humanities department.
In 2009, he founded Stamina Foundation, a self-declared nonprofit organization of which he was president. He also owned a market research company.

In 2015 he was convicted of criminal charges in relation to the Stamina therapy, receiving a 5.5-years prison sentence.

Vannoni died on 10 December 2019, at the age of 52, after a long illness.

Therapy

The proposed method includes the conversion of mesenchymal stem cells (cells usually intended for generation of bones and adipose tissue) into neurons after a short exposure to retinoic acid diluted in ethanol. The therapy consists in removing cells from the bone marrow of patients, their in vitro manipulation (incubation of stem cells for 2 hours in an 18 micromolar solution of retinoic acid), and finally their infusion into patients themselves.

Davide Vannoni, the lead researcher, repeatedly declined to reveal details of his method beyond those available in its patent application.

Supposed effectiveness

Vannoni has never produced scientific evidence concerning the efficacy of the method, but has always advocated its validity. These alleged benefits are highlighted by multiple videos, often self-produced, some of which were broadcast on television, most of the time showing children. From the investigations of the Prosecutor of Turin, the benefits shown in the videos were not measured scientifically and objectively and were the result of exaggeration or adjuvant therapies to which the children were subjected, or normal physical growth that continued despite the disease.

History

Davide Vannoni reported that he had started the project as a result of personal experience: he has been hospitalized in 2007 in Ukraine for a facial palsy by transplantation of stem cells, getting partial health benefits. He then decided to propose the treatment in Italy too, collaborating, among others, with two Ukrainian biologists, Vyacheslav Klimenko and Olena Shchegelska, first settling in Turin, setting up a laboratory in the basement of his company, then moving to a beauty center in San Marino.

Between 2007 and 2009 the treatment began to be administered to patients with no control or authorization by the national health system, while it was being advertised in several hospitals by leaflets proclaiming that "more than a thousand cases treated, a recovery of damages 70–100% (90 strokes with 72 recoveries [...]), a range of twenty diseases treated", and by a video showing presumed miraculous healing obtained with stem cells. During this period, 68 persons (three were underage) were subjected to the alleged treatment; fourteen of them made payments from 4,000 to 55,000 Euros.

In 2009 an investigation was initiated by the magistrate Raffaele Guariniello after an article published in the Corriere della Sera newspaper. The investigation sought to clarify the position of Vannoni concerning the use of stem cells outside of the experimental protocols required by law. At the end of 2009, several newspaper articles were written regarding the activities of Vannoni. Press reports that Vannoni promised his treatment for many neurodegenerative diseases, getting payments ranging from 20,000 to 50,000 Euros, with unclear methodologies and sometimes causing harm and unintended consequences. 
The investigation of Guariniello also involved the beauty center of San Marino, which was not authorized to administer medical treatments.

While Vyacheslav Klimenko and Olena Shchegelska, both left Italy under investigation, Vannoni and his group continued to administer therapies in several Italian cities, often at "beauty" establishments or transplant centers, moving to Turin, Carmagnola, Trieste, Como and lastly Brescia.

Brescia is an important stage in the story of Stamina: thanks to pediatrician Marino Andolina, a collaborator of Vannoni and now vice-president of Stamina Foundation, the Stamina therapy was practiced as expanded access in the Civilian Hospitals of Brescia, the second main Italian hospital, on patients (including several children) affected by serious neurodegenerative diseases.

In early 2012, the Carabinieri's Anti-Adulteration Group and the Italian Pharmaceutical Agency began an inspection, which revealed non-compliance with the requirements of safety and hygiene, and a lack of documents required by law. It was found that the cell preparations did not contain any relevant quantities of mesenchymal stem cells, which were not able to differentiate into neurons, and contained a significant amount of dangerous pollutants. According to the analysis of medical records of 36 patients, there was no improvement in the patients, except in three cases (two underage children and an adult), but only on the basis of subjective evaluations. After this, Stamina treatments carried out at the hospital of Brescia were suspended.

Media and political repercussions

The Stamina method came under the media spotlight after a broadcast of the popular Italian television program Le Iene, went on air in February 2013, which showed its use in some children with various neuro-degenerative diseases, including SMA type I. It was argued that the infusion of stem cells would have resulted in significant improvements in few weeks in the status of these diseases, and it was suggested, without any evidence, that it might alter the fatal course. The TV program was accused by many of scientific misinformation.

The Stamina case, now both as a media phenomenon and scientifically, was analyzed and criticized by, among others, the Accademia dei Lincei, by Nature and by the European Medicines Agency. In May 2013, thirteen scientists published a critical analysis of the method in the EMBO Journal, highlighting their concerns about the inconsistency of scientific evidence, the methodological shortcomings and the lack of publications.

2012 Medicine Nobel prize laureate Shinya Yamanaka published a public statement in which he expressed concern for permission for experimentation by the Italian authorities of a method about which the safety was not known and which lacked any evidence of efficacy, while Italian oncologist Umberto Veronesi compared the outcry over Stamina to the story of the Di Bella method, an ineffective cancer treatment administered in violation of treatment protocols.

In May 2013 the Italian Government unanimously approved the start of a clinical trial of the method developed by Vannoni, also allocating 3 million Euros for the years 2013–2014, and identifying two healthcare facilities in Abruzzo and Sicily where initiation of the treatment was authorized. In August, Vannoni gave to the National Institute of Health the protocol of the method Stamina in order to start the experiment.

On 11 July, the scientific journal Nature published an editorial calling on the Italian government not to proceed with the experimentation, as it was unjustified by any scientific reason, defining Vannoni as a "psychologist transformed into businessman doctor", while defining Stamina therapy as "based on false data" and "plagiarized".

2013 Medicine Nobel prize laureate Randy Schekman was cited by some pro-stamina families as a supporter of the therapy; the researcher had actually published an article critical of the editorial policies of major scientific journals and firmly denied the support of Stamina, defining Vannoni a quack.

Starting of experimentations

The protocols proposed the method Stamina as suitable for the treatment of X-linked bulbospinal neuropathy, cerebral palsy and amyotrophic lateral sclerosis, but, surprisingly, the choice of diseases to be treated excluded SMA type I, the most treated pathology up to that point. Treatment of SMA patients was the main subject of the television program Le Iene, which introduced the Stamina method to the general public. For this condition, the inventors and supporters of Stamina stated excellent efficacy, so that even the Stamina Foundation argued that SMA 1 was the only disease for which "certified improvements" were documented. 
Paradoxically, Vannoni stated that SMA type I was not included because it was "too complex in attesting improvements".

In September, the Scientific Committee established by the Minister of Health, Beatrice Lorenzin, drew up a negative consultative report, according to which the method likely had low replicability; the report also highlighted a high risk of transmission of diseases such as AIDS and BSE (Mad cow disease).
The reasons for such rejection were subjected to the study by the Ministry of Health, that on 10 October definitively rejected the Stamina therapy as "dangerous to the health of patients".

The report of the Ministry also stated that the doses of mesenchymal stem cells in the protocol of Vannoni were minimal, "suitable for mice, not for humans"; the dose used for stem cell transplantation in humans is about two million per kilogram of body weight, while the protocol Stamina involved the transplantation of two million cells in total, without taking into account body weight. 
It was also discovered that the protocol delivered to the Civilian Hospitals of Brescia and the one delivered to the Ministry would be different.

After Vannoni appealed in court against the commission responsible for human experimentation, accusing them of an alleged lack of impartiality, a new scientific committee was  appointed  in December 2013. Ten months later, the committee of experts appointed by the Minister of Health Beatrice Lorenzin unanimously rejected the Stamina method, stating that there was no need for starting another scientific experimentation of the therapy.

Some tests were done outside of Italy, but in no case was the transformation of cells into neurons achieved.

In January 2014 Brescia Civilian Hospitals' medical staff officially declared that Stamina therapy was no longer practiced in the hospital, with the exception of those cases where treatment was ordered by the courts.

Patents

In December 2009, just after Klimenko and Shchegelska left, Vannoni deposited four patent applications for the Stamina therapy, two in Italy, one in Canada, the last one in the US, stated Enrica Molino, one of his collaborators, as the sole inventor; several elements in the patent applications were taken from Shchegelska's researches published on Ukrainian Neurosurgical Journal in 2006, including the pictures of stem cells, but her name is never mentioned.

After submitting the applications to the various patent offices, Vannoni retired them before the official response could come. However, he could no longer withdraw the application at the U.S. Patent Office, the only one where it was possible to find documentation.
In 2012, the Patent Office of the United States had partially rejected the patent application, with a procedure that allows the re-presentation: Vannoni has never resubmitted.

The rejection was due to the fact that the demand had insufficient details regarding the methodology, to the fact that it is unlikely that cell differentiation occurs during an incubation period so short (from 40 minutes to 2 hours) and that the appearance of the nerve cells in the cultivation might be the result of cytotoxic changes.

Substantially there is no official patent on the Stamina method, contrary to the claims of Vannoni, but only a formal application to the patent office of the U.S., however, refused.

Judicial cases

In February 2014 Vannoni was accused of attempted fraud of the Piedmont regional authorities after he has applied for a loan of €500,000 to fund a stem cell laboratory that never opened. In April 2014 he along with 20 other people was charged with criminal conspiracy, fraud, as well as trade and administration of hazardous medicines. Vannoni was also personally investigated for abusive exercise of the medical profession, defamation and substitution of person.

In August 2014 a court in Turin demanded that Stamina should stop operating and their equipment should be confiscated. This was supported by Professor Elena Cattaneo, a stem cell expert and an Italian senator. The Senate used its powers to request evidence that to-date had been denied to others. The eventual enquiry resulted in several recommendations, including that courts should always have scientific representatives in similar cases.

In October 2014, the Medical Association of Trieste suspended Marino Andolina from the exercise of the profession and in June 2015, he was placed under house arrest, facing trial for alleged exploitation of vulnerable patients and administration of unproven therapies in exchange for money. He was released in late 2016.

In 2015, Vannoni was convicted on criminal charges related to administering an unproven treatment and barred from carrying out medical profession in Italy.

Other controversies

Vannoni has repeatedly stated that the medical care provided by his method is "no charge", and that the money he received would be "donations". Several ex-patients and relatives of former patients have argued that there is a definite price list.

In July 2013 Vannoni registered the trademark Stamina. In the same period, Stamina Foundation signed a €2 million commercial agreement with Medestea Biotech, an Italian biotechnology company focused on stem cell technologies, which has been accused of working towards getting a deregulation for the use of stem cells.

Suspicions were raised by the wealthy lifestyle of Vannoni: he owned a Porsche 911 registered in Switzerland and lived in a luxury mansion near Turin.

Vannoni announced his intention to move with the researchers and a cooperative of patients' families to Cape Verde or another country outside Italy, talking about an alleged conspiracy of the pharmaceutical lobbies, bureaucracy and politics against Stamina therapy in Italy. He also claimed that three US universities were willing to test his method.

References

External links 
 Official site of Stamina Foundation

Alternative medical treatments
Health fraud
Stem cells